"Range Life" is a song by  American indie rock band Pavement, the third single from their 1994 album Crooked Rain, Crooked Rain.

Background 
The single was not commercially released in the United States. It was issued by the band's UK label at the time, Big Cat Records. Both B-sides are outtakes from the Crooked Rain, Crooked Rain sessions and are included on the 2004 deluxe reissue of that album. This song was one of many to be included in the group's greatest hits album Quarantine the Past: The Best of Pavement.

Controversy 
The song attracted attention with controversial lyrics that seemed to mock alternative rock superstars the Smashing Pumpkins and the Stone Temple Pilots; Pumpkins frontman Billy Corgan expressed his displeasure in magazine interviews, while songwriter Stephen Malkmus maintained that his words had been misinterpreted and no insult was intended. Regardless, Pavement, which was due to tour for Lollapalooza in 1994, got kicked out when the Smashing Pumpkins, the headlining act, threatened to cancel their dates if Pavement performed. Pavement would eventually play Lollapalooza the next year. An early 1993 demo of the song did not feature the controversial verse; guitarist Spiral Stairs recalled in 2004 that when Malkmus first revealed these new lyrics to his bandmates at the New York City recording sessions for Crooked Rain, Crooked Rain, "we almost lost our lunch from laughing so much."

Track listing

Europe release

US promo

References

1995 singles
Pavement (band) songs
1993 songs
Songs written by Stephen Malkmus
Alternative country songs
Country rock songs